Boris Trajkovski Stadium (Macedonian Cyrillic: Стадион Борис Трајковски) is a football stadium in Skopje, North Macedonia. It is named after former president Boris Trajkovski and is currently the home of FK Madžari Solidarnost and FK Vardar for alternate venue used. The stadium seats 3,000 people, including 100 VIP seats and press section of 60.

References

External links
Fotos Stadium Boris Trajkovski 
Macedonian Football 
Football Federation of Macedonia 

Football venues in North Macedonia